Mancherial is a city and headquarters of the Mancherial district of the Indian state of Telangana. It is both the district and administrative headquarters of Mancherial mandal in the Mancherial revenue division. It is located on the north banks of the Godavari River.

History 
Historically, it was part of Adilabad District, but now it is a separate district by itself. It was, until as recently as less than a hundred years ago, rich in forest resources and many small scale & large scale industries but was of little economic and political importance. Gonds mainly depended on farming for their livelihoods. After the Singareni Collieries Company coal mines were established in the region, it became industrialised. During the 1970s, an Industrial training institute was opened there.

Demographics 

As of the 2011 census of India, Mancherial has a population of 89,935. Males constitute 51% of the total population and females 49%. Mancherial has an average literacy rate of 75.71%, higher than the national average: male literacy is 83.16%, and female literacy is 67.92%. In Mancherial, 8% of the population is under 6 years of age.

in 2018 Mancherial municipality had an estimated population of 110,000.

Population density of Mancherial:
1981 - 32,478
1991 - 52,657
2001 - 70,381
2011 - 89,935
2018 - 110,000.

The majority of people in the area practice Hinduism, followed by Islam and Christianity. Telugu is the most widely spoken language.

Education 
List of colleges in Mancherial:
 Government Medical College 
 Government ITI college
 Government Degree college
 Government Junior college

References 

Cities and towns in Mancherial district
Mandal headquarters in Mancherial district